Xenops is a genus in the bird family Furnariidae, the ovenbirds. The genus comprises three species of xenops, all of which are found in Mexico, Central America and South America, particularly in tropical rain forests.

They are small birds with a longish tail, a laterally flattened bill with an upturned tip (except in the slender-billed xenops), brown back and buff or rufous wing stripe. They forage for insects on bark, rotting stumps or bare twigs, moving mechanically in all directions on the trunk like a woodcreeper, but without using the tail as a prop.

Together with the distinct great xenops (Megaxenops parnaguae), this genus forms the tribe Xenopini, which based on some recent studies belongs in the woodcreeper and xenops subfamily Dendrocolaptinae, while others have found them to be part of the "traditional" ovenbirds. A study from 2013 found that they should be a family distinct from both.

Species
Formerly, the rufous-tailed xenops was placed in this genus, but it has been moved to the monotypic Microxenops. The following species remain in the genus Xenops:

References 

 
Bird genera